Niederroßbach is an Ortsgemeinde – a community belonging to a Verbandsgemeinde – in the Westerwaldkreis in Rhineland-Palatinate, Germany.

Geography

Location
The community lies in the Westerwald between Siegen and Limburg an der Lahn. Through the community flow the Ortsbach and the Roßbach. Niederroßbach belongs to the Verbandsgemeinde of Rennerod, a kind of collective municipality. Its seat is in the like-named town.

Neighbouring communities
Niederroßbach's neighbours are Oberroßbach, Fehl-Ritzhausen, Neustadt and Zehnhausen bei Rennerod.

History
In 1431, Niederroßbach had its first documentary mention.

Politics

The council is made up of 13 council members, including the extraofficial mayor (Bürgermeister).

Economy and infrastructure

Running right near the community are Bundesstraßen 54, linking Limburg an der Lahn with Siegen, and 255, leading from Montabaur to Herborn. The nearest Autobahn interchange is Haiger/Burbach on the A 45 (Dortmund–Hanau), some 17 km away. Between Niederroßbach and Neustadt once lay a halt on the now abandoned Westerwaldquerbahn (railway). The nearest InterCityExpress stop is the railway station at Montabaur on the Cologne-Frankfurt high-speed rail line.

References

External links
Niederroßbach in the collective municipality’s Web pages 

Municipalities in Rhineland-Palatinate
Westerwaldkreis